Bluffer’s Media Limited is the British media company that publishes the Bluffer's Guide series of books, formerly owned by Oval Books.

The “Bluffer’s Guides” are a collection of humorous pocket-sized guidebooks, written by experts and offering readers the opportunity to pass off appropriated knowledge as their own on a variety of subjects.

See also 

Francis – Francis Coleman, author of The Bluffer’s Guides to Ballet and Opera.
André - André Launay, author of The Bluffer’s Guide to Antiques.
Peter – Peter Clayton, co-author of The Bluffer’s Guide to Jazz.
Ross – Ross Leckie, author of The Bluffer’s Guide to the Classics. 
Thomas Morris – Thomas V. Morris, author of The Bluffer’s Guide to Philosophy.

External links 
Shop, Bluffers.com 
Bluffer’s Guide to Etiquette, BBC interview with William Hanson.
Bluffer’s Guide to Etiquette, BBC interview with William Hanson.
Bluffer’s Guide to Etiquette, Article in the Daily Mirror newspaper by William Hanson.
Bluffer’s Guide to Chocolate, Article in The Daily Express newspaper by Neil Davey. 
Review of Bluffer’s Guide to Jazz in The Daily Telegraph. 
The Bluffer’s Guide to Camping, Article by Emma Smith in The Huffington Post. 
BBC Radio 4 interview with Ross Leckie, Bluffer’s Guide to the Classics.  
BBC Radio 4 interview with Ross Leckie, Bluffer’s Guide to the Classics.  
, Intellectual Property Office.

Publishing companies of the United Kingdom